Haydarlı, Şereflikoçhisar is a village in the District of Şereflikoçhisar, Ankara Province, Turkey.

References

Villages in Şereflikoçhisar District